Foul Play is a 1977 Spanish drama film directed by Juan Antonio Bardem. It won the Golden Prize the 10th Moscow International Film Festival.

Cast
 Alfredo Landa as Juan
 Francisco Algora as Venancio
 Victoria Abril as Lolita
 Mara Vila as Mujer que pasa frente al taller
 Miguel Ángel Aristu as Del taller #1 (as Miguel Aristu)
 Julián Navarro as Del taller #2
 Eduardo Bea as Del taller #3
 José Yepes as Del taller #4
 Antonio Gonzalo as Del taller #5
 Rafael Vaquero as Del taller #6
 Jesús Enguita as Del 600 averiado #1
 Concha Leza as Del 600 averiado #2 (as Conchita de Leza)
 Antonio Orengo as Del 600 averiado #3

References

External links
 

1977 films
1977 drama films
Spanish drama films
1970s Spanish-language films
Films directed by Juan Antonio Bardem
1970s Spanish films